Spanish City is a dining and leisure centre in Whitley Bay, England. 

Spanish City may also refer to:
A city in Spain 
Spanish City (novel), by Sarah May, 2002

See also
 Spanish Town (disambiguation)